The 2015–16 LEB Oro season was the 20th season of the Spanish basketball second league LEB Oro. The season started on October 2 and ended on May 27 with the last game of the promotion playoffs finals.

Teams

Promotion and relegation (pre-season)
Despite the aim to increase the number of teams to sixteen, finally a total of 14 teams contested the league, including 12 sides from the 2014–15 season and two promoted from the 2014–15 LEB Plata. Ford Burgos, CB Valladolid and Instituto de Fertilidad Clínicas Rincón, who will play in this season's LEB Plata resigned to play in the league while CB Prat Joventut, relegated in the last season, achieved a vacant berth.

On 28 August 2015, the Spanish Basketball Federation extended the league to 16 teams with FC Barcelona Lassa B from LEB Plata and San Pablo Inmobiliaria Burgos, a new-creation in Burgos that replaces Ford Burgos.

Teams relegated from the 2014–15 Liga ACB
Gipuzkoa Basket (will play in ACB as Ford Burgos did not fulfill the requirements to promote)
Montakit Fuenlabrada (will play in ACB as Club Ourense Baloncesto was not admitted in the league)

Teams promoted from the 2014–15 LEB Plata
Cáceres Patrimonio de la Humanidad
Amics Castelló

Venues and locations

Personnel and kit manufacturers

Managerial changes

Regular season

League table

Positions by round
The table lists the positions of teams after completion of each round.
<div style="overflow:auto">

Results

Copa Princesa de Asturias
At the half of the league, the two first teams in the table play the Copa Princesa de Asturias at home of the winner of the first half season (15th round). If this team doesn't want to host the Copa Princesa, the second qualified can do it. If nobody wants to host it, the Federation will propose a neutral venue.

The Champion of this Cup will play the play-offs as first qualified if it finishes the league between the 2nd and the 5th qualified. The Copa Princesa will be played on January 29, 2016.

Teams qualified

|}

The game

Playoffs

Stats leaders in regular season

Points

Rebounds

Assists

Performance Index Rating

Awards

All-LEB Oro team
The All-LEB Oro team was selected after the end of the playoffs.
 Borja Arévalo (Cocinas.com)
 Jeff Xavier (Cafés Candelas Breogán)
 Marc Blanch (Quesos Cerrato Palencia)
 Eduardo Hernández-Sonseca (Club Melilla Baloncesto)
 Óliver Arteaga (Planasa Navarra)

MVP of the regular season
 Óliver Arteaga (Planasa Navarra)

Coach of the season
 Sergio García (Quesos Cerrato Palencia)

All-Rising Stars team
This was the first year that this team was chosen.

 Ferran Bassas (Unión Financiera Baloncesto Oviedo)
 Marc García (FC Barcelona Lassa B), also chosen as Rising Star Player of the season.
 Joan Tomàs (Quesos Cerrato Palencia)
 Beka Burjanadze (Leyma Básquet Coruña)
 Goran Huskić (Peñas Huesca)
Coach:  Quim Costa (Peñas Huesca)

MVP by week

References and notes

Notes

External links
Official website

 
LEB Oro seasons

LEB2
Spain
Second level Spanish basketball league seasons